Acleris kodamai is a species of moth of the family Tortricidae. It is found in South Korea, China and Japan.

The wingspan is about 24 mm. There is one generation per year with adults on wing from June to July.

The larvae feed on Pinus koraiensis.

References

Moths described in 1965
kodamai
Moths of Asia